ICP8, the herpes simplex virus type-1 single-strand DNA-binding protein, is one of seven proteins encoded in the viral genome of HSV-1 that is required for HSV-1 DNA replication. It is able to anneal to single-stranded DNA (ssDNA) as well as melt small fragments of double-stranded DNA (dsDNA); its role is to destabilize duplex DNA during initiation of replication. It differs from helicases because it is ATP- and Mg2+-independent. In cells infected with HSV-1, the DNA in those cells become colocalized with ICP8.

ICP8 is required in late gene transcription, and has found to be associated with cellular RNA polymerase II holoenzyme.

See also
Virus
Virology

References

External links
ICP8 on UniProt

Simplexviruses
Viral nonstructural proteins